Llopart is a surname. Notable people with the surname include:

 Mercedes Llopart (1895–1970), Spanish soprano
 Francesc Sabaté Llopart (1915–1960), Spanish anarchist
 Jorge Llopart (1952–2020), Spanish race walker

See also
 Llompart

Catalan-language surnames